Reginald Koettlitz (1860–1916) was a British physician and polar explorer. He participated in the Jackson–Harmsworth expedition to Franz Josef Land and in the Discovery Expedition to Antarctica.

Early life 
Reginald Koettlitz was born on 23 December 1860 in Ostend. His father was a Lutheran minister, and his mother was English. He was educated at Dover College and later Guy's Hospital in London, where he received training as a physician. He practiced medicine near Dover.

Exploration 

In 1894, Koettlitz joined the Jackson–Harmsworth expedition to Franz Josef Land in the Arctic, as physician and geologist. On returning to Dover, brought back a polar bear, which is still in the Dover Museum. Koettlitz Island (Ketlitsa Ostrova) – a low-lying island in the British Channel in the Franz Josef Land archipelago – is named after him.

In 1900 he travelled to Somaliland and Abyssinia with Herbert Weld Blundell. He also journeyed to the Amazon.

In 1901, Koettlitz volunteered for Robert Falcon Scott's Discovery Expedition to Antarctica, as physician and botanist. Many of his samples are held in the archives of the Natural History Museum, London. His assistant on this trip was E.A. Wilson, later surgeon on Scott's ill-fated Terra Nova Expedition. On a trip he led across McMurdo Sound, Koettlitz discovered two glacial features later named after him: the Koettlitz Glacier and the Koettlitz Névé. For his role in the Discovery Expedition, Koettlitz was awarded a medal from the Royal Geographical Society.

Later in life, he practised medicine in Cradock, South Africa. He died from dysentery in January 1916, as did his French born wife on the same day.

Publications

References

External links 
 Reginald Koettlitz collection, Scott Polar Research Institute Archives, University of Cambridge
 Reginald Koettlitz – Biographical notes
 Crew of Scott's Discovery Expedition Reginald Koettlitz biography - Scott's Forgotten Surgeon, published 2011
 Reginald Koettlitz Autograph Album and Letters at Dartmouth College Library

1860 births
1916 deaths
Explorers of Antarctica
Explorers of the Arctic
People from Ostend
People from Coxhoe
Deaths from dysentery